Blankfield is a surname. Notable people with the surname include:

 Mark Blankfield (born 1950), American comedic actor
 Peter Wolf (born Peter Walter Blankfield, 1946), American musician
 Joanne Blankfield, who played Judith in the opera Batavia

See also
 Blackfield (disambiguation)